"Wish Wish" is a song by American record producer DJ Khaled featuring American rapper Cardi B and Atlanta-based rapper 21 Savage, taken from Khaled's 2019 studio album Father of Asahd. It was released on May 17, 2019, as track two on its parent album. This song marked the second time each artist had worked with another, their firsts being: Cardi B and 21 Savage on "Bartier Cardi" (2017), 21 Savage and DJ Khaled on "Iced Out My Arms" (2017), and DJ Khaled and Cardi B on "Dinero" (2018).

Critical reception
Carl Lamarre of Billboard noted that the song established 21 Savage as a "go-to feature" and that his appearance is met with "unmatched wit". Thomas Hobbs of NME complimented producer Tay Keith, "who consistently takes the aesthetic of John Carpenter horror scores and translates it into hood anthems", while noting Cardi B and 21 Savage "both make an artform out of gross brags". A.D. Amorosi at Variety wrote that Cardi's presence on the song is the most notable and that she elevated it "into a tuneful, spicy trap epic".

Music video
Both collaboration and video were first teased on February 12, 2019. The music video was released on May 20, 2019, along with a series of videos from Khaled's album Father of Asahd. It was directed by Eif Rivera and co-directed by Khaled. The video shows Cardi B dancing in a black catsuit and Chanel swimsuit, as well as joint shots by Khaled and 21 Savage. It also features product placement by Fashion Nova.

Charts

Weekly charts

Year-end charts

Certifications

References

2019 songs
DJ Khaled songs
Songs written by DJ Khaled
Cardi B songs
Songs written by Cardi B
21 Savage songs
Songs written by 21 Savage
Songs written by Tay Keith
Song recordings produced by Tay Keith